The London Borough of Camden is in percentage terms the second-greenest of the Inner London boroughs (based on public green spaces). It contains most of the swathe of land Hampstead Heath and many smaller green spaces. The Central London part of the borough, south of Euston Road, is characterised by its elegant garden squares with large instances: Tavistock Square and Bedford Square. In this part runs the Regent's Canal (a 'Green Route') around the top edge of Regent's Park, a little of which is in Camden, including all of associated Primrose Hill. Highgate Cemetery is in Camden but Highgate Wood is in the neighbouring borough of Haringey.

Apart from Camden Council, a variety of agencies are responsible for the upkeep of open space in the
borough. For example, Hampstead Heath is mostly owned by the City of London Corporation save Kenwood House which has an area of lawns, ponds and flower beds undivided from the heath, owned by English Heritage. Highgate Cemetery is managed by its own trust. The Phoenix Garden is managed by an independent charity.

Some open spaces of note:

 Bloomsbury Square
 Brunswick Square
 Coram's Fields
 Gordon Square
 Hampstead Heath (681 acres (2.8 km2) in Camden, 110 acres (0.4 km2) in next-door Barnet)
 Highgate Cemetery
 The Hill Garden and Pergola - see Thomas Hayton Mawson
 Kilburn Grange Park
 Lincoln's Inn Fields (the largest public square in London)
 Phoenix Garden (the only community garden in Soho and Covent Garden)
 Primrose Hill
 Regent's Park (part of)
 Russell Square
 Talacre Gardens
 Tavistock Square
 St James' Gardens
 St Martin's Gardens
 St Pancras Old Church Gardens
 Waterlow Park

Nature reserves
The borough has four Local Nature Reserves:
Adelaide Nature Reserve
Belsize Wood
Camley Street Natural Park
Westbere Copse

It has one Site of Special Scientific Interest:
Hampstead Heath Woods

See also
List of Sites of Special Scientific Interest in Greater London

External links
 Camden Council: Parks and open spaces

Notes